Grong Station is a railway station located in the village of Grong in the municipality of Grong in Trøndelag county, Norway. It is located on the Nordlandsbanen railway, and the station opened in 1929. Starting on 1 April 1942, the restaurant operations was taken over by Norsk Spisevognselskap.  The station was the eastern terminus of the Namsos Line until that was closed in 2002.

References

Railway stations in Trøndelag
Railway stations on the Nordland Line
Railway stations opened in 1929
1929 establishments in Norway
Grong